The Ontario Stock Car Association of Asphalt Racers, usually shortened to the acronym OSCAAR, is a Canadian stock car racing series featuring three divisions, Open Wheeled Modifieds, Hot Rods and Pro Sprint. It has been running since 1990, with Dave Burbridge winning the inaugural championship. Previously the series included an Outlaw Super Late Models division.

OSCAAR Modified Series
The OSCAAR Modified Series was created in 2012 and consists of 450 horsepower asphalt modified stock cars.

Champions

OSCAAR Hot Rod Series
The OSCAAR Hot Rod Series is for vintage-bodied cars with crate engines and modern running gear. The cars include Studebakers, Tri-Five Chevrolets, Camaros, Mustangs, and Barracudas of the muscle car era and began in 2017.

Champions

OSCAAR Pro Sprint Series
The OSCAAR Pro Sprint Series was launched in 2016 and consists of 1/4 scale sprint style cars, powered by 440cc snowmobile engines that generate approximately 85 horsepower.  Each car weighs 450 lbs, run one inch off the ground and can reach upwards of 100 mph.

Champions

OSCAAR Outlaw Super Late Model Series
The OSCAAR Outlaw Super Late Model Series was a division in OSCAAR for 27 seasons. The cars consisted of a low-cut, flat-sided late model chassis that were offset to the drivers side for better cornering on oval tracks and allowed the greatest horsepower of any Ontario stock car division. The series final season was in 2017.  It was replaced by the new Ontario Outlaw Super Late Model Series the following year.

Champions

Tracks

Current

Former

See also
 NASCAR Pinty's Series
 APC United Late Model Series
 Ontario Sportsman Series

References

External links

Motorsport in Canada
Auto racing series in Canada
Stock car racing
Stock car racing series
Recurring sporting events established in 1990